The 2009 Fiordland earthquake struck the South Island of New Zealand with a magnitude of 7.8 at 9:22 pm (NZST) on 15 July. It is among the largest New Zealand earthquakes to occur, including the Culverden/Kaikoura earthquake in 2016 and the 1931 Hawke's Bay earthquake, which both had a magnitude of 7.8.

Earthquake
The main shock was a reverse fault (thrust), with the Indo-Australian Plate subducting beneath the Pacific Plate. The earthquake lifted a large area of land around the epicentre approximately 1 metre.

New Zealand's Institute of Geological and Nuclear Sciences (GNS Science) initially measured the earthquake at magnitude 6.6, but later revised the magnitude to 7.8.

The reported energy release was compared to "500 million tonnes of TNT,[and] 25,000 times more powerful than the atomic bomb dropped on Nagasaki in 1945".

The quake twisted New Zealand's South Island, with Puysegur Point, on the Southwestern tip of the island, moving 30 cm closer to Australia (westward); Te Anau moved 10 cm, Bluff 3 cm and Dunedin 1 cm.  It is also believed to have caused an increased stress in the southern, offshore part of the Alpine Fault.

A considerable number of aftershocks were recorded.

Effects

The earthquake was felt throughout the South Island, and in the lower North Island as far as New Plymouth. No injuries or fatalities were reported, and it caused only minor damage. Power outages were experienced in several parts of the South Island. Over 200 claims for damage have been listed with the Earthquake Commission, New Zealand's agency for earthquake compensation.

Landslides in the Fiordland National Park near Dusky Sound cleared large tracts of forest.

Tsunami

Tsunami warnings were issued soon after the earthquake by authorities in New Zealand and Australia, as well as the Pacific Tsunami Warning Center in Hawaii. Civil defence officials in Southland also issued a 'potential tsunami' warning, stating their concerns about widely varying measurements of the earthquake. Reacting to the Pacific warnings, about fifty residents and tourists on Lord Howe Island were evacuated, and in Sydney a theatre in Bondi Beach was evacuated, and residents told to keep away from the shore. the tsunami reached a height of 1 metre in Jackson Bay, 25 cm at Charleston, 12 cm at Dog Island, 14 cm at Port Kembla, and 6 cm at Spring Bay. A maximum run-up of 230 cm was recorded, however, the tsunami may have been higher in some areas that were not surveyed due to the remoteness of the affected area. The tsunami warnings were subsequently cancelled or reduced.

See also
List of earthquakes in 2009
List of earthquakes in New Zealand

References

Further reading

External links 
Infonews.co.nz

2009 earthquakes
Fiordland earthquake
Earthquakes in New Zealand
History of Southland, New Zealand
2009 disasters in New Zealand